Nguyễn Trọng Xuyên (1926–2012) was a Việt Cộng, and later Vietnamese People's Army, general. In the Battle of Pat To 1969 he was commander of the Việt Cộng's Military Region 6.

References

1926 births
2012 deaths
Members of the 6th Central Committee of the Communist Party of Vietnam
Members of the 7th Central Committee of the Communist Party of Vietnam